The Miami RedHawks are the National Collegiate Athletic Association (NCAA) Division I intercollegiate athletic teams that represent Miami University in Oxford, Ohio, United States. Miami is a member of the Mid-American Conference (MAC) East Division and sponsors teams in nine men's and ten women's NCAA sanctioned sports; the RedHawks hockey team is a member of the National Collegiate Hockey Conference. The football team competes in the Football Bowl Subdivision (FBS), the highest level for college football. The Redhawks are arch-rivals with the Ohio Bobcats. In box scores for sporting events, the RedHawks sports teams are usually referred to as Miami (OH) to differentiate from the Miami Hurricanes, a Division I school in Florida.

Sports sponsored

Football 
The Miami University RedHawks football team is one with a rich tradition of history. The school boasts the longest continuous college football rivalry west of the Allegheny Mountains against the Cincinnati Bearcats, and has one of the oldest football programs in the country, dating to the year 1888.

Cradle of Coaches 

Miami University is most notable for having many quality coaches start their coaching career in some capacity at its school. Some notable college football coaches who coached at Miami University include John Pont, Ara Parseghian, Woody Hayes, Bo Schembechler, Weeb Ewbank, Jim Tressel and Terry Hoeppner.

Baseball 
A notable baseball-team alumnus is Walter Alston, who managed the Los Angeles Dodgers. World Series Champion Adam Eaton is the most notable RedHawks baseball-team alumnus, winning a World Series title in 2019 with the Washington Nationals.

Ice hockey 

The RedHawks on ice played in the Central Collegiate Hockey Association (CCHA) before its disbanding in 2013, and fielded one of the best teams in the league in recent years. In 2006, the RedHawks earned the first #1 national ranking in school history and were CCHA regular season champs. They made it to the championship game, but lost to Michigan State. Beginning in the 2013–2014 season, they will play in the National Collegiate Hockey Conference.

Instead of playing in the Mid-American Conference ("MAC"), the mid-major conference most Miami varsity sports play in, the RedHawks competed against the larger schools of the CCHA such as the Michigan Wolverines and the Michigan State Spartans, who normally compete in the Big Ten.

In 2006 Miami University replaced the old Goggin Ice Arena from 1976 with the new $34.8-million state-of-the-art Goggin Ice Center, with a capacity of around 4,000. Both buildings are named for former University vice-president Lloyd Goggin.

In 2008 the RedHawks set team records for winning percentage and wins with .797 and 33 respectively. That year the RedHawks captured their first #1 seed in school history and advanced to the quarterfinals in the NCAA tournament, losing to Boston College. The team was led that year by All-Americans Ryan Jones and Alec Martinez.

The 2009 RedHawks became the first Miami team to reach the Frozen Four in the history of the program. The team made it to the championship game and carried a 3–1 lead into the final minute before giving up 2 goals 6 on 5 with the opposition net empty, and ultimately lost in overtime on an unlucky deflection, 4–3 to college hockey powerhouse Boston University.

Synchronized skating 
Miami's synchronized skating team began in August 1977 as a "Precision Skating Club" at Goggin Ice Center. The program achieved varsity status by 1996, and is also home to one of the first varsity synchronized skating teams in the country.

They are the 1999, 2006, and 2009 U.S. national champions. Miami won a silver medal at the 2007 International Skating Union World Synchronized Skating Championships. This is the highest finish for any US skating team and the first medal ever won by Team USA for synchronized skating.

Miami created a junior-varsity level team beneath the senior level. After serving as the coach of Miami's program for 25 years, Vicki Korn announced her retirement in May 2009.

(Note: Synchronized skating is sanctioned by U.S. Figure Skating, not by the NCAA. Most synchronized skating teams are clubs not affiliated with any college or university; Miami is one of about 15 schools that sponsor varsity or club teams.)

Golf
The men's golf team has won 13 Mid-American Conference championships: 1948, 1950, 1970, 1974, 1981, 1987, 1988, 1989, 1990, 1991, 1992 (co-champions), 1996, 2015. RedHawks who have had success at the professional level include: Bob Lohr (one PGA Tour win) and Brad Adamonis (one Nationwide Tour win).

Tennis

Dave Abelson played tennis for the school, and later represented Canada in the Pan American Games and the Maccabiah Games.

Club sports

Water Ski (Men's and Women's) 
The men's and women's team compete in the National Collegiate Water Ski Association (NCWSA) in slalom, jump and trick events. They compete around the Midwest in the Great Lakes Region to qualify to the national competition. The Redhawks won the Division II National Championship 2016, 2017 and 2019.

Men's lacrosse 
The men's lacrosse team represents Miami University and currently competes in non-varsity lacrosse in the Men's Collegiate Lacrosse Association (MCLA) Division I level as a member of the Great Rivers Lacrosse Conference (GRLC). The RedHawks lacrosse team plays home games in Yager Stadium located in Oxford, Ohio. The team is coach Chuck Wilson. Miami finished the 2010 season second place in the CCLA and won its first CCLA play off game in over ten years. Miami boasted a 9–4 record, including 5–0 at home.

Rugby
Founded in 1968, the Miami University Rugby Football Club plays college rugby in Division I in the MAC Conference. Miami reached the national playoffs in 2009 and again in 2010. Miami rugby was named the school's top performing and respected club among all of Miami's club sports in 2009 and in 2010. Miami rugby is supported by the Miami University Men's Rugby Football Club Alumni Association, which provides resources to the team. Miami rugby has been led since 2007 by Jared Moore.

Discontinued sports

Wrestling

At one time, Miami had a very competitive wrestling program. They won eight Mid-American Conference Titles (1961, 1964, 1965, 1967, 1968, 1984, 1991 & 1992) and produced 51 NCAA qualifiers who earned 81 qualifications to the NCAA Division I tournament. Seven of their wrestlers earned All American status with HWT Mike Holcomb placing twice (5th in 1982, 3rd in 1984).

The program was reinstalled as a club sport by Seth Preisler in 2002. In 2003, the club team took second in their regional tournament.

Team name

Before the early 1930s, the Miami University nicknames were interchangeable, including the Miami Boys, the Big Reds, and the Reds and Whites. The first glimpse of the Miami University "Redskins" was in 1928, when a Miami student referred to their team as the "Big Red-Skinned Warriors". By 1931, the Redskins had stuck as the Miami University nickname, and was the official nickname of the Miami University athletics program for nearly seventy years.

In the 1992–1994 academic year, at the urging from students in the Honors College by Gregory T. Wilkins, who went to the Oklahoma-based Miami Tribe for support, the Miami University Redskins officially changed their names to the "RedHawks", which they remain today. It was during the 1997–1998 basketball season that the new mascot of Miami, Swoop the Redhawk, was revealed during a game.

Notable athletics alumni

 Kevyn Adams, Hockey
 Walter Alston, Baseball
 Jacob Bell, Football
 Dan Boyle, Hockey
 Alain Chevrier, Hockey
 Charlie Coles, Basketball
 Wayne Embry, Basketball
 Andy Greene, Hockey
 Ron Harper, Basketball
 Ryan Jones, Hockey
 Charlie Leibrandt, Baseball
 Alec Martinez, Hockey
 Tim Naehring, Baseball
 Martin Nance, Football
 Terna Nande, Football
 Ira Newble, Basketball
 Adam Eaton, Baseball
 John Harbaugh, Football
 Brian Pillman, Football
 Travis Prentice, Football
 Ryne Robinson, Football
 Ben Roethlisberger, Football
 Brian Savage, Hockey
 Milt Stegall, Football
 Wally Szczerbiak, Basketball
 Brandon Brooks, Football
 Randy Walker, Football

See also
List of college athletic programs in Ohio

References

External links